New Zealand Masts and Towers range in size from short flagpoles to high radio transmitter antenna structures. The highest mast is in Titahi Bay, being the highest structure in the Southern Hemisphere at time of construction.  Later it became the highest in New Zealand and then later second to the Sky Tower in Auckland.

Height
The radio mast of the Titahi Bay Transmitter is New Zealand's second tallest structure. The antenna is a 'guyed support' type, broadcasting at the low end of the medium wave AM radio broadcast band, 567 kHz, with 50 kilowatts of power. The AM radio transmitting antenna is a high structure, due to the height being a function of wavelength (station frequency).
 television masts were built in many strategic locations (such as Waiatarua and Christchurch) in the late 1950s / early 1960s. They were self-supporting steel structures, manned with then NZBC New Zealand Broadcasting Corporation staff, and occasionally carrying NZPO New Zealand Post Office vhf and marine radio services. The primary purpose was 100 kW (ERP) vhf television.
Varying height, a backbone of microwave steel self-supporting structures for microwave links were also built by the New Zealand Post Office (now owned by Telecom New Zealand) from the mid-1950s on. A network of 4 GHz STC vacuum tube based stations were built between Hamilton at the northern end and Palmerston North at the southern end. The path was via New Plymouth. Several networks of 6 GHz Lenkurt solid state based stations were built between Whangarei and Auckland via Waiatarua  and later a spur to Warkworth satellite station. Hamilton to Palmerston North via Rotorua, Taupo, Napier, with a spur to Tauranga from Kaimai station. A southern network of Wellington to Dunedin via Cook Strait was also built.
 free standing wooden or steel masts are used for the other VHF and UHF commercial and infrastructure radio services.

Locations
Mount Cargill
Mount Kaukau
Titahi Bay

History 
The antenna mast at Titahi Bay currently carries the Radio New Zealand National programme, previously having a call-sign of 2YA.

Gallery

See also
Radio mast
List of masts
Goodnight Kiwi
Titahi Bay Transmitter
Sky Tower

External links
New Zealand film and television in 1981
Place where you can download a video of the goodnight kiwi
http://members.iinet.net.au/~paulkoh/Towers.htm
Official Website

Masts
Masts
Guyed masts